Neotysonia is a genus of Australian plants in tribe Gnaphalieae within the family Asteraceae.

Species
The only known species is Neotysonia phyllostegia, native to Western Australia.

References

Gnaphalieae
Monotypic Asteraceae genera
Flora of Western Australia